Uma Manqha (Aymara, also spelled Uma Mankha, Huama Mankha) is a  mountain in the Andes of Bolivia. It is situated in the La Paz Department, Larecaja Province, in the north of the Sorata Municipality.

References 

Mountains of La Paz Department (Bolivia)